Central Coast Regional District is a regional district in British Columbia, Canada. It has a total land area of 24,559.5 km2 (9,482.5 sq mi). When it was created in 1968, it was known as the Ocean Falls Regional District, named for the then-largest town in the region, the company town of Ocean Falls, which has since become a ghost town. The district name was confirmed in 1974, but changed to Central Coast Regional District in 1976.

Demographics 

Note: Totals greater than 100% due to multiple origin responses.

Government 
The Central Coast Regional District (CCRD) is unique in the province in that it has no incorporated municipalities within its borders. The Regional District has five Electoral Areas, each of which elect a single director to the District's Board of Directors. According to the 2001 Census, the populations of the electoral areas are:

Notes

References

Community Profile: Central Coast Regional District, British Columbia; Statistics Canada

External links

 
Regional districts of British Columbia